The Sonate pour cor, trompette et trombone (Sonata for horn, trumpet and trombone), FP 33a, by Francis Poulenc is a piece of chamber music composed in 1922 and dedicated to Raymonde Linossier (1897–1930). Poulenc revised it in 1945. Its total performance time is about eight minutes.

History 
The sonata is the composer's second extant work of chamber music, after the Sonata for two clarinets. It was written between August and October 1922 at the same time as the Sonata for clarinet and bassoon, and was premiered at the Théâtre des Champs-Élysées in Paris on 4 January 1923 at a Satie-Poulenc concert organized by Jean Wiener. Poulenc revised the composition in 1945.

Reception and legacy 
Since its inception, reception has been favourable, especially that of Charles Koechlin which Poulenc reports in one of his letters, specifying: "... a beaucoup aimé ses 'fourbis', qu'il a trouvé très bien écrits. C'est là l'essentiel." (... loved very much his 'mess' which he found very well written. That is essential.) Poulenc's biographer Henri Hell finds that the two pieces written the same year "acid and tender, well written for wind instruments, have all the quality of the Sonata for two clarinets and the contemporary Trois mouvements perpétuels".

Structure and style 
Like most of the composer's chamber music pieces, with the exception of the Cello Sonata, the sonata for horn, trumpet and trombone has three short movements:

 Allegro moderato
 Andante
 Rondeau

The character of the music resembles a fair music, conforming to the spirit of Les Six. Kathy Henkel described the first movement as a series of dance episodes, the second as a lullaby derived from motifs of the first movement, and the third as a rondo with more light-hearted dance music. She summarizes the piece's "variety of tone colors, striking rhythms, delicious dissonances, and elegant wit".

Selected recording 
 Ab Koster (horn), Frédéric Mellardi (trumpet), Nicolas Vallade (trombone) : Francis Poulenc – Intégrale Musique de chambre – RCA Red Seal
 André Cazalet (horn), Frédéric Mellardi (trumpet), Guillaume Cottet-Dumoulin (trombone) : Francis Poulenc – Intégrale Musique de chambre avec vents – indésens!

References

Bibliography

External links 
 Francis Poulenc – Sonata for Horn, Trumpet and Trombone (1924) (Score-Video) on YouTube
 Sonata for Horn, Trumpet and Trombone, FP 33a (Poulenc, Francis) on IMSLP
 Francis Poulenc: Sonata for horn trumpet and trombone / A structural analysis identifying significance, form and implications for performance (Doctoral thesis) digital.library.unt.edu
 Sonata for Horn, Trumpet and Trombone by Poulenc on laphil.com
 Francis Poulenc — Sonata for Horn, Trumpet, and Trombone on Paul Thomason writer
 Sonata for horn, trumpet and trombone (1922) Francis Poulenc on Trove

Compositions by Francis Poulenc
Classical music trios
Sonatas
1918 compositions